The office of Mayor of Chesterfield in Derbyshire, has existed since 1598 when Queen Elizabeth issued a charter to the town, granting the town the right to have a mayor. The first holder of this position was Ralph Clarke. This charter is on display in the Chesterfield Museum and Art Gallery.

Prior to 1933 when the Local Government Act 1933 came into effect, any local citizen could hold the position, following this act only elected councillors could become mayor.

In 1974, a new charter issued by Queen Elizabeth II was granted when Staveley and Brimington where added to the borough to form the Chesterfield Borough Council.

Office-holders 

 1598 Ralph Clarke
 1599 Godfrey Heathcote
 1600–1601 Thomas Rayneshaw
 1602–1605 Thomas Heathcote
 1606 Godfrey Heathcote
 1607 Thomas Woodward
 1608–1609 Martin Bretland
 1610 Godfrey Heathcote
 1611 Nicholas Webster
 1612–1613 Ralph Wheeldon
 1614–1617 William Boot
 1618 Godfrey Heathcote
 1619 Ralph Wheeldon
 1620–1621 Godfrey Webster
 1622 William Boot
 1623 Richard Taylor
 1624–1625 Godfrey Heathcote
 1626 Richard Milnes
 1627 Reynold Bretland
 1628 George Dickons
 1629 Ralph Clarke
 1630 Richard Taylor
 1631 Thomas Forth
 1632 Godfrey Heathcote
 1633 William Clarke
 1634 Reynold Bretland
 1635 Ralph Clarke
 1636-7 Richard Taylor
 1638 William Newton
 1639–1644 George Dickons
 1645 Reynold Bretland
 1646 Thomas Forth
 1647 Thomas Bretland
 1648 Ralph Clarke
 1649 Richard Wood
 1650 William Newton
 1651 Samuel Taylor
 1652 Reynold Bretland
 1653 Thomas Forth
 1654 Hercules Clay
 1655 Ralph Clarke
 1656 Richard Wood
 1657 Gabriel Wain, Captain
 1658 William Newton
 1659 Thomas Forth
 1660 Thomas Needham
 1661 Hercules Clay, removed 25 September 1662 and John Allwood installed
 1662 John Allwood
 1663 Richard Marchant
 1664 James Milnes
 1665 Thomas Pinder
 1666 Anthony Legate
 1667 Richard Marchant
 1668 John Woodward
 1669 James Milnes
 1670 Richard Clarke
 1671 Thomas Bretland
 1672 Peter Dowker
 1673 Richard Youle
 1674 Richard Marchant
 1675 John Woodward
 1676 James Milnes
 1677 Richard Clarke
 1678 Peter Dowker
 1679 Richard Coupe
 1680 Richard Youle
 1681 Richard Marchant
 1682 John Woodward
 1683 Thomas Dowker
 1684 Robert Stringfellow
 1685 Peter Dowker
 1686 Richard Coupe
 1687 Richard Youle
 1688 Francis Houldsworth
 1689 John Woodward
 1690 Thomas Dowker
 1691 Francis Moore
 1692 John Ashe
 1693 Roger Coates
 1694 John Milnes
 1695 David Seale
 1696 Richard Youle
 1697 Thomas Webster
 1698 Francis Moore
 1699 John Revell
 1700 John Ashe
 1701 Jacob Breilsford
 1702 Thomas Bower
 1703 Richard Wood
 1704 David Seale
 1705 Francis Moore
 1706 John Revell
 1707 John Bright
 1708 Jacob Breilsford
 1709 Thomas Bower
 1710 Richard Wood
 1711 David Seale
 1712 William Woodhouse
 1713 John Revell
 1714 John Bright
 1715 William Clarke
 1716 Christophe Pegge
 1717 Jacob Breilsford
 1718 William Sharshaw
 1719 Job Bradley
 1720 John Revell
 1721 John Bright
 1722 William Clarke
 1723 Christopher Pegge (died in January 1724 before completing term)
 1724 John Revell
 1724 Samuel Inman
 1725 Job Bradley
 1726 John Bright
 1727 Thomas Bower
 1728 John Revell
 1729 William Clark
 1730 Samuel Inman
 1731 Job Bradley
 1732 John Bright
 1733 Francis Bagshaw
 1734 Richard Milnes
 1735 William Clark
 1736 Samuel Inman
 1737 John Burton
 1738 Job Bradley
 1739 Francis Bagshaw
 1740 Joshua Jebb
 1741 Bernard Lucas
 1742 Job Bradley
 1743 William Clark
 1744 Job Bradley
 1745 Francis Bagshaw
 1746 John Fidler
 1747 Robert Watts
 1748 Joshua Jebb
 1749 William Saunders
 1750 Henry Thornhill
 1751 John Fidler
 1752 Robert Watts
 1753 Joshua Jebb
 1754 William Saunders
 1755 Henry Thornhill
 1756 John Fidler
 1757 Joshua Jebb
 1758 William Saunders
 1759 Henry Thornhill
 1760 Joshua Jebb
 1761 Nicholas Twigg
 1762 Thomas Clark
 1763 Godfrey Webster
 1764 Joshua Jebb
 1765 Nicholas Twigg
 1766 Thomas Clark
 1767 Samuel Towndrow
 1768 Charles Staniforth
 1769 Samuel Jebb
 1770 Joshua Jebb
 1771 No Mayor elected; Writ of Mandamus issued 8 July 1772 to compel election; Nicholas Twigg elected 15 July.
 1772 Robert Jennings
 1773 William Barker
 1774 Samuel Towndrow
 1775 John Willot
 1776 Thomas Short
 1777 Robert Jennings
 1778 Samuel Towndrow
 1779 John Elam
 1780 Thomas Short
 1781 Robert Marsden
 1782 John Elam
 1783 John Bale
 1784 John Elam
 1785 Thomas Dutton
 1786 John Bale
 1787 Thomas Dutton
 1788 Mark Hewitt
 1789 John Bale
 1790 Thomas Dutton
 1791 Job Bradley
 1792 Thomas Dutton
 1793 John Elam
 1794 Job Bradley
 1795 John Elam
 1796 John Bower
 1797 Thomas Dutton
 1798 John Bower
 1799 John Saxton
 1800 Thomas Dutton
 1801 John Bower
 1802 Thomas Dutton
 1803 John Bower
 1804 John Elam
 1805 Thomas Dutton
 1806 John Bower
 1807 John Elam
 1808 Thomas Dutton
 1809 John Bower
 1810 George Fletcher
 1811 John Elam
 1812 Thomas Dutton
 1813 John Bower
 1814 John Elam
 1815 Joseph Graham
 1816 John Muggleston
 1817 John Elam
 1818 Samuel Dutton
 1819 Joseph Graham
 1820 Samuel Dutton
 1821 John Elam
 1822 John Muggleston
 1823 Gilbert Crompton
 1824 Samuel Dutton
 1825 John Elam
 1826 George Fletcher
 1827 John Muggleston
 1828 Thomas Wilcockson
 1829 William Battison
 1830 Samuel Dutton
 1831 John Muggleston
 1832 William Battison
 1833 Samuel Dutton
 1834 Thomas Wilcockson
 1835 Thomas Wilcockson to November, then Gilbert Crompton
 1836 John Charge
 1837 Gilbert Crompton
 1838 Samuel Dutton
 1839 Edmund Gilling Maynard
 1840 Robert Daniel
 1841 Gilbert Crompton
 1842 Samuel Dutton
 1843 Thomas Clark
 1844 John Gregory Cottingham
 1845 Samuel Dutton
 1846 Edmund Gilling Maynard
 1847 John Gilbert Crompton
 1848 John Gregory Cottingham
 1849 John Walker
 1850 Godfrey Heathcote
 1851 Edmund Gilling Maynard
 1852 John Walker
 1853-4 William Drabble
 1855 William Hewitt
 1856 William Drabble
 1857 William Hewitt
 1858 Charles Stanhope Burke Busby
 1859–1860 Joseph Shipton
 1861 William Drabble
 1862 Thomas Jones
 1863 Cornelius Black
 1864 James Ball White
 1865 James Wright
 1866–1867 Charles Stanhope Burke Busby
 1868 James Ball White
 1869–1870 James Wright
 1871–1872 John Marsden
 1873 Thomas Philpot Wood
 1874 George Albert Rooth
 1875 James Wright & George Albert Rooth
 1876 John Marsden
 1877 John Drabble
 1878 Theophilus Pearson
 1879–1880 John Brown
 1881 John Brown to May, then John Higginbottom
 1882 John Higginbottom
 1883–1884 George Edward Gee
 1885–1886 Thomas Philpot Wood
 1887 George Booth
 1888 Bowery Douglas
 1889 Edward Woodhead
 1890–1892 John Morton Clayton
 1893–1894 William Bradbury Robinson
 1895 Adam Clarke Locke
 1896 Charles Paxton Markham
 1897 James Pearson
 1898 Bowery Douglas
 1899–1901 William Spooner
 1902 Charles Portland Robinson
 1903 James Pearson
 1904 Arthur Ernest Hopkins
 1905–1907 George Albert Eastwood
 1908 Samuel Edward Short
 1909–1910 Charles Paxton Markham
 1911 Victor Cavendish, 9th Duke of Devonshire
 1912 William Bradbury Robinson
 1913–1918 Ernest Shentall
 1919–1920 Wilfred Hawksley Edmunds
 1921 William Rhodes
 1922 George Clark
 1923–1924 William Edmund Wakerley
 1925–1926 Harry Cropper
 1927 Violet Rosa Markham
 1928 Philip Moffat Robinson
 1929–1930 Herbert Jowett Watson
 1931 Thomas Dennis Sims
 1932 Arthur Whiteley Swale
 1933 Robert Anderson McCrea
 1934 Harry Varley
 1935 Harry Pearson Short
 1936 George Frank Kirk
 1937 Harry Hatton
 1938 Samuel Thomas Rodgers
 1939 James William Thompson
 1940 Walter Wicks
 1941 Sydney Ashton Syddall
 1942 William Baines
 1943 Edgar Thomas Styler
 1944 William Edwin Taylor
 1945 Thomas Joseph Mitchell
 1946 Florence Robinson
 1947–1948 Edgar Smith
 1949 John Eaton Bird
 1950 William Porter
 1951 George William Heathcote
 1952 Frank Hadfield
 1953 Edwin Swale
 1954 Leonard Wilkinson
 1955 Henry Charles Day
 1956 William Weston
 1957 Hiram Tagg
 1958 Levi Heath
 1959 John Leslie Hadfield
 1960 Harold Charles Mullett
 1961 Harry Cantrell Martin
 1962 Ernest Bradbury Robinson
 1963 James Anderson
 1964 Edward Cyril Hancock
 1965 Tom Bucknall
 1966 Annie Collishaw
 1967 George Albert Wigfield
 1968 George Henry Rees
 1969 Victor Stuart Allen
 1970 Elizabeth Mary Turner
 1971 Basil Crosbie Willett
 1972 John Ford
 1973 Lois Tideswell
 1974 Harold Barber Fisher
 1975 John Wickins
 1976 Walter Everett
 1977 William Gorman
 1978 Patrick Edward Kelly
 1979 Margaret Wyper Anderson
 1980 Stanley Meakin
 1981 Cissie Sargeant
 1982 Donald Arthur Wain
 1983 Ronald Jepson
 1984 Michael Gabriel Caulfield
 1985 Thomas Edmund Whyatt
 1986 William Smith
 1987 Edwin Harold Barker
 1988 John Smith
 1989 Leslie McCulloch
 1990 Arthur Webber
 1991 William Jepson
 1992 Terence Kendellen
 1993 George Arthur Wright
 1994 Richard Albert Matthews
 1995 David Stone
 1996 Geoffrey Waddoups
 1997 Margaret Ann Higgins
 1998 Michael Lancelot Fanshawe
 1999 Terence Frank Gilby
 2000 Michael Leverton
 2001 James McManus
 2002 Paul Najid Al Rahman Barry
 2003 June Isabel Beckingham
 2004 Asad Shafi Qazi
 2005 Keith Falconer
 2006 Trudi Mulcaster
 2007 Christine Ludlow
 2008 Fred Quayle
 2009 Adrian Kitch
 2010 Keith P Morgan
 2011 Peter I Barr
 2012 Donald Parsons
 2013 Paul Christopher Stone
 2014 Alexis Saliou Diouf
 2015 Barry Bingham
 2016 Steve Brunt
 2017 Maureen Davenport
 2018 Stuart Brittain
 2019 Gordon Simmons
 2020 Glenys Falconer 
 2021 Glenys Falconer

References 

Chesterfield